The Marinefährprahm (MFP, naval ferry barge) was the largest landing craft operated by the German  during World War II. The MFP was use for transport, minelaying, as an escort and a gunboat in the Mediterranean, Baltic and Black Seas as well as the English Channel and Norwegian coastal waters. Originally developed for Operation Sea Lion the proposed invasion of England, the first of these ships was commissioned on 16 April 1941, with approximately 700 being completed by the end of war. Allied sources sometimes refer to this class of vessel as a "Flak Lighter" or "F-lighter".

Design and development
Four types, A–D, were developed, whose size and armament grew from type to type. Some specialised derivates such as artillery vessels and minelaying vessels were also built on the basis of these craft. They were not mainly used for their initial invasion role but for transport and supply, escort and harbour protection. The MFPs were protected by -thick steel armor plating.

Type A
This first version of the MFP was to be of all-welded construction to save weight. A shortage of skilled welders meant that only the original prototype, F100, was built in this fashion. All following examples featured extensive riveting. The original power plant of the MFP-A was to be two  BMW 6U engines and one 6-cylinder Deutz diesel truck engine. At full throttle, the MFP-A could make . The BMW engines proved unreliable and used excessive amounts of fuel so it was decided to use a standard set of three Deutz diesel truck engines.

Type A1

The A1s were intended for use in Operation Herkules, the planned Italo–German invasion of Malta. Ten were modified to carry captured Soviet KV-1 or KV-2 heavy tanks. This required strengthening and widening of the well decks and internal ramps and outward repositioning of the bow ramp counterbalance weights to make room.

The  (artillery ferry, AFP) was a gunboat derivative of the MFP. These ships were used for escorting convoys, shore bombardment and minelaying. They were fitted with two 88 mm guns and light AA guns.

These   (colloquially "") were built in Italian shipyards, primarily in and around Palermo and gave the  the amphibious capability to land infantry, armored vehicles and supplies on beaches. Up to three M13/40 medium tanks and 100 infantry could be carried or an equivalent weight in cargo. The only major design changes were to substitute Italian-made diesel engines (OM BXD  six-cylinder types as used in the  diesel trains) for the three German Deutz truck engines and to replace the German 7.5 cm deck gun with a 76 mm/40. The anti-aircraft armament was usually protected with sandbags or concrete blocks.

The first  was laid down in March 1942. By July of that year, the month slated for the Malta invasion, all 65 MZs were ready for deployment but on 27 July the invasion was indefinitely postponed. Many of the Italian MZs were diverted to the task of ferrying supplies from Italy to Libya and between ports along the Libyan coast to support the advance of  into Egypt. In September 1942, another forty MZs (761–800) were ordered. The Italian MZs played a key role in defeating Operation Agreement, an attempted Allied landing in Tobruk on 14 September 1942, when they defeated an MTB flotilla in the port of Tobruk.

A third series of forty MZs was ordered in June 1943 but none were ever completed. A further 20 examples (MZ 801–820) were planned, copies of the MFP-D (including the same engines and armament) but were never built as by then the war situation for Italy had worsened considerably and her armed forces had been expelled from North Africa. Ninety-five  were built in Italian shipyards prior to the Armistice of Cassibile with the Allies on 8 September 1943.

Operations
Twelve  were used during Operation Beowulf II as part of the German invasion of Saaremaa, Hiiumaa and Muhu on 14 September 1941. The  provided logistical support during the Siege of Sevastopol in June 1942. Between January and October 1943,  were used to evacuate the 17th Army from the Kuban bridgehead on the Taman Peninsula in southern Russia, despite Soviet attacks during the Battle of the Caucasus. The sea evacuation brought out 239,669 soldiers, 16,311 wounded, 27,456 civilians and 115,477 tons of military equipment (primarily ammunition), 21,230 vehicles, 74 tanks, 1,815 guns and 74,657 horses to the Crimea. In February 1944, three MFPs were purchased by the Romanian Navy and renamed PTA-404, PTA-405 and PTA-406.

See also
 Landing craft tank, an equivalent Allied naval class

References

Bibliography

 
 
 
 
 
 
  (Originally published as Gunboat 658: The story of the Operations of a Motor Gunboat in the Mediterranean from the Fall of Tunisia until the German Surrender)

Further reading

External links

 historisches-marinearchiv.de (German)
 german Navy.de (English)

Landing craft
Ship types
 
Amphibious warfare vessels